Road star may refer to:

 Roadstar, a  British hard rock & heavy metal band
 Yamaha XV1600A motorcycle